O'Ryan Omir Browner (born February 12, 1987) is an American R&B singer. He is the younger brother of R&B singer Omarion. He released a self-titled album in 2004 which aimed at the teen pop audience.

Background
He dated American singer Jhene Aiko from 2005 to 2008. Aiko gave birth to their daughter on November 19, 2008.

Discography

Albums

Singles

References

External links
 
 

Living people
1987 births
20th-century African-American male singers
Musicians from Los Angeles
Singers from California
21st-century American singers
21st-century American male singers
21st-century African-American male singers